4,5:9,10-diseco-3-hydroxy-5,9,17-trioxoandrosta-1(10),2-diene-4-oate hydrolase (tesD (gene), hsaD (gene)) is an enzyme with systematic name 4,5:9,10-diseco-3-hydroxy-5,9,17-trioxoandrosta-1(10),2-diene-4-oate hydrolase ( (2Z,4Z)-2-hydroxyhexa-2,4-dienoate-forming). This enzyme catalyses the following chemical reaction

 (1E,2Z)-3-hydroxy-5,9,17-trioxo-4,5:9,10-disecoandrosta-1(10),2-dien-4-oate + H2O  3-[(3aS,4S,7aS)-7a-methyl-1,5-dioxo-octahydro-1H-inden-4-yl]propanoate + (2Z,4Z)-2-hydroxyhexa-2,4-dienoate

The enzyme is involved in the bacterial degradation of the steroid ring structure.

References

External links 
 

EC 3.7.1